Oracle, in comics, may refer to:

Oracle, an alias used by DC Comics character Barbara Gordon
Oracle, the original alias of the DC Comics character who would be reimagined as Aurakles
Oracle (Marvel Comics), a Marvel character and member of the Shi'ar Imperial Guard
Oracle Inc., a company established by the Marvel character Namor
The Oracle, a W.I.T.C.H. character

See also
Oracle (disambiguation)